Calliostoma pulchrum, common name the beautiful top shell, is a species of sea snail, a marine gastropod mollusk in the family Calliostomatidae.

Description
The size of the shell varies between 8 mm and 16 mm. The shell has a much elevated conical shape. It has a pale claret color, with a dark brown, acute apex, and large ill-defined spots of white. It shows a spiral series of minute dark red oblong spots, which are proportioned to the size of the spiral ridges on which they are placed. The ridges of least size are not spotted. The shell is solid, with ten or twelve minute spiral ridges, of which one near the base of the whorls is larger, and three are of an intermediate size, viz., one on each side of the suture and one on the middle of the whorls. On the lower side of the body whorl are sixteen or eighteen other minute revolving ridges, of which every second or third is spotted. The spire has the outlines nearly rectilinear. The seven and one-half whorls are a little concave, acutely prominent in the lower part. The subangular body whorl is moderately convex beneath. The subquadrate aperture is iridescent within. The columella is subtruncate. There is no umbilicus.

Distribution
This species occurs in the Caribbean Sea, the Gulf of Mexico, off the West Indies and in the Atlantic Ocean off North Carolina to West Florida, USA, at depths between 1 m and 366 m.

References

 Adams, C. B. 1850. Descriptions of supposed new species of marine shells, which inhabit Jamaica. Contributions to Conchology 5: 69–75.
 Pilsbry, H. A. 1900. A new Calliostoma from Florida. Nautilus 13: 128–129.
 Rosenberg, G., F. Moretzsohn, and E. F. García. 2009. Gastropoda (Mollusca) of the Gulf of Mexico, Pp. 579–699 in Felder, D.L. and D.K. Camp (eds.), Gulf of Mexico–Origins, Waters, and Biota. Biodiversity. Texas A&M Press, College Station, Texas.

External links
 

pulchrum
Gastropods described in 1850